Michael O'Looney is head of communications for Elliott Management. Previously he was managing director and head of corporate communications for Barclays PLC in the Americas, and for Merrill Lynch. He is also the former Deputy Police Commissioner for the New York City Police Department and was a television reporter and anchor for CBS News, WCBS, and New York 1 News.

In January 2002, Police Commissioner Raymond Kelly appointed O'Looney as the NYPD's deputy commissioner for public information. In that role he served as the department's chief spokesman and as a senior advisor to the police commissioner. Two weeks into his job, O'Looney was called on to help negotiate the peaceful end to a hostage stand-off at the 19th Police Precinct on Manhattan's Upper East Side. A gunman had taken a detective hostage inside the interrogation room and was demanding to speak to a reporter. O'Looney, a former reporter who still had his business cards from his previous employment, posed as a reporter and after four hours of negotiations, the gunman released the detective unharmed. A year later, O'Looney was involved in another high-profile incident when he spotted an armed ex-con wanted for a string of assaults. When the suspect tried to run, O'Looney, who was unarmed, and a uniformed police officer tackled the suspect on a subway platform and placed him under arrest. In 2003, O'Looney was inducted into the NYPD's Honor Legion.

Prior to the NYPD, O'Looney was an Emmy-nominated television reporter who worked for CBS News, WCBS TV, and New York 1 News. He also worked at CNBC and the Financial News Network. O'Looney began his broadcast career in at WIBX News in his native, Utica, New York. On September 11, 2001, O’Looney was part of the WCBS TV anchor team that broadcast news of the terrorist attacks on the World Trade Center. In October 2001, he was the first reporter to gain entry to the apartment in Hamburg, Germany that terrorist Mohammed Atta used to plot the 9/11 terrorist attacks. In December 2001, O'Looney was the first Western reporter to get an exclusive interview with Yasser Arafat following the PLO Chairman's speech renouncing suicide bombings. The interview took place in the courtyard of Arafat's shelled headquarters in the West Bank city of Ramallah.

After leaving the NYPD in December 2003, O’Looney joined Merrill Lynch where he was a managing director and head of U.S. corporate communications.  He joined Barclays Capital in 2009.

O’Looney appeared as a reporter in both the HBO series The Sopranos, and 1996 movie City Hall starring Al Pacino.

O’Looney is married to television anchor Annika Pergament.

References

1965 births
Living people
American television journalists
American male journalists
Barclays people
CNBC people
New York City Police Department
People associated with the September 11 attacks